Jorge Alberto González Barillas (born 13 March 1958), popularly known as El Mágico (The Magical One), is a Salvadoran former professional footballer who played mainly as a forward.

At the club level, he played mainly for FAS and Spain's Cádiz in a 24-year senior career. Dogged by his self-admitted and often-reported lack of discipline, he was often hailed as the greatest and most skilled footballer ever produced by El Salvador, and as one of the greatest players from the CONCACAF region.

González represented the El Salvador national team for more than two decades, taking part in the 1982 World Cup and the 1998 Gold Cup.

Club career

Early years
Born in San Salvador, González began his professional career in 1975, representing ANTEL and Independiente F.C. over two seasons before moving to C.D. FAS in the Salvadoran Primera División.

While playing in El Salvador, González became known as Mago but later, upon transferring to Spain, his nickname was slightly changed to Mágico.

Cádiz
Both Atlético Madrid and Cádiz CF became interested in acquiring González in 1982 but, despite the Colchoneros higher profile, he signed with the Andalusians. His first game in Spain came in a friendly against La Barca de la Florida, while his Segunda División debut was on 5 September 1982 in a 1–1 home draw against Real Murcia, scoring in the process. He became a fan favorite thanks to his dazzling moves and goals, but was also notorious for his love of the nightlife and his sleeping habits were also brought into question, whilst his on-field abilities endeared him to the Cádiz fans enough that they overlooked his minor indiscretions; he finished his first season with 33 games and 14 goals as the team promoted to La Liga.

In 1983 and 1984, Cádiz traveled to the United States. González was the principal attraction the first year, but in the following the side was joined by FC Barcelona and its superstar Diego Maradona, who later claimed that the Salvadoran was "without a doubt amongst the greatest ten players I have ever seen play, in all my life". His debut in the top division came on 11 September 1983 in a 1–3 home loss against the same opponent, Murcia, and they were immediately relegated.

Despite this, Paris Saint-Germain F.C. of France showed interest in signing him as well as Italian teams Atalanta BC, ACF Fiorentina and U.C. Sampdoria, but González chose to stay in Cádiz. His stay was somewhat short-lived, however, as he was transferred to Real Valladolid in the 1985 January transfer window due to problems with manager Benito Joanet. He did not get along at Valladolid, where his personal life was tightly controlled and, after playing in just nine games, he returned to Cádiz exactly one year later; as a precaution against his partying, his contract was reputed to have contained a clause stipulating he was to be paid US$700 per game played and none for the ones he missed.

After several coaching changes, González was finally able to shine again for Cádiz under Víctor Espárrago, still competing in a further four top-tier campaigns. In all, he scored 58 goals in 194 league games for the club until his departure on 6 June 1991, aged 33.

Later career

González returned to El Salvador and FAS after Atalanta again failed to sign him. He stayed with the former until 1999 when he retired to begin coaching as an assistant in Houston, Texas. After a short stint in the US, he returned to his homeland.

In 2001, Cádiz honored González with a testimonial match, with the proceeds going to the victims of a recent earthquake in El Salvador. In 2003, the Salvadoran National Assembly gave González the government's highest honor, the Hijo Meritísimo, and renamed the national stadium the Flor Blanca after him. On 28 August 2004, another testimonial was played in his honor, this time in El Salvador at the Mágico González Stadium, between America XI, a group of international stars, and a team made up of ex-FAS players; he played a half with either side and scored a total of three goals.

International career
Many critics and journalists say that if González had been Argentinian or Brazilian, he would have ranked amongst the best in the world, alongside Maradona and Pelé. He received the first of his 62 caps for El Salvador on 1 December 1976, in a FIFA World Cup qualification match against Costa Rica. He was also instrumental in leading the nation to the 1982 FIFA World Cup – the second time in history – where he appeared in all three group-stage matches, including the 10–1 loss to Hungary.

González represented his country in 31 World Cup qualifiers, and scored 21 goals in full internationals.

International goals
Scores and results list El Salvador's goal tally first.

Style of play and temperament
A slender and highly creative forward, with superb ball control, technical ability and dribbling skills, González was also known for his quick feet and use of tricks and feints (including the flip flap, the Cruyff turn and the step over), as well as his accuracy with the ball and speed in possession – however, his talent was often overshadowed by his questionable behaviour off the pitch. He was widely considered to be the greatest Salvadoran footballer of all time, as well as one of the best-ever Latin American footballers in the history of the game. In 2000, he was named his nation's Player of the Century in IFFHS' Player of the Century Elections.

A versatile forward, González was capable of playing both as a winger or as a second striker, but was also deployed as a centre-forward, as a playmaker in the number 10 role or even as a midfielder on occasion, and often wore the number 11 shirt. His playing style served as an inspiration for Maradona, who was a staunch admirer of the Salvadoran, describing him as one of the ten best players he had ever seen and even stating that "[w]e, in training, always tried to imitate him [González], but we couldn't."

Personal life
González was born to a family of modest means in the Luz neighborhood of San Salvador, one of seven brothers and a single sister. His older brother, Mauricio González Pachín, was a footballer who became well known at the local level.

Mágico married Ana María Ruano, daughter of another Salvadoran football legend, Alfredo Ruano. His son, Rodrigo, also played in the country's top division, for C.D. Atlético Marte.

HonoursFAS'
Salvadoran Primera División: 1977–78, 1978–79, 1981, 1994–95, 1995–96
CONCACAF Champions League: 1979

References

External links

Stats at Cadistas1910 

Tribute website 

1958 births
Living people
Sportspeople from San Salvador
Salvadoran footballers
Association football forwards
C.D. FAS footballers
La Liga players
Segunda División players
Cádiz CF players
Real Valladolid players
El Salvador international footballers
1982 FIFA World Cup players
1998 CONCACAF Gold Cup players
Salvadoran expatriate footballers
Expatriate footballers in Spain
Salvadoran expatriate sportspeople in Spain